Rheinisch-Bergischer Kreis is an electoral constituency (German: Wahlkreis) represented in the Bundestag. It elects one member via first-past-the-post voting. Under the current constituency numbering system, it is designated as constituency 100. It is located in western North Rhine-Westphalia, comprising the Rheinisch-Bergischer Kreis district.

Rheinisch-Bergischer Kreis was created for the inaugural 1949 federal election. Since 2017, it has been represented by Hermann-Josef Tebroke of the Christian Democratic Union (CDU).

Geography
Rheinisch-Bergischer Kreis is located in western North Rhine-Westphalia. As of the 2021 federal election, it is coterminous with the Rheinisch-Bergischer Kreis district.

History
Rheinisch-Bergischer Kreis was created in 1949. It was named Rheinisch-Bergischer Kreis upon its creation, but renamed to Rheinisch-Bergischer Kreis I in the 1980 through 1998 elections. It returned to its current name in the 2002 election. In the 1949 election, it was North Rhine-Westphalia constituency 13 in the numbering system. From 1953 through 1961, it was number 72. From 1965 through 1976, it was number 66. From 1980 through 1998, it was number 67. From 2002 through 2009, it was number 101. Since the 2013 election, it has been number 100.

Originally, it was coterminous with the Rheinisch-Bergischer Kreis district. In the 1980 through 1998 elections, it comprised the municipalities of Bergisch Gladbach, Kürten, Odenthal, Overath, Rösrath, and Wermelskirchen from Rheinisch-Bergischer Kreis. It acquired its current borders in the 2002 election.

Members
The constituency has been held by the Christian Democratic Union (CDU) during all but one Bundestag term since 1949. It was first represented by Paul Lücke 1949 to 1972. Bertram Blank of the Social Democratic Party (SPD) was elected in 1972, and served a single term before the CDU regained it in 1976. Franz Heinrich Krey then served as representative until 1994. He was succeeded by Wolfgang Bosbach from 1994 to 2017. Hermann-Josef Tebroke was elected in 2017.

Election results

2021 election

2017 election

2013 election

2009 election

References

Federal electoral districts in North Rhine-Westphalia
Rheinisch-Bergischer Kreis
Constituencies established in 1949
1949 establishments in West Germany